Robert Hudspeth (April 6, 1894 – August 2, 1935), nicknamed "Highpockets", was an American Negro league first baseman from 1920 to 1932.

A native of Luling, Texas, Hudspeth made his Negro leagues debut in 1920 with the Indianapolis ABCs. He went on to play for several teams, including the Lincoln Giants and Brooklyn Royal Giants, and finished his career with the New York Black Yankees in 1932. Hudspeth died in 1935 at age 41.

References

External links
 and Baseball-Reference Black Baseball stats and Seamheads

1894 births
1935 deaths
Place of death missing
Bacharach Giants players
Brooklyn Royal Giants players
Columbus Buckeyes (Negro leagues) players
Hilldale Club players
Indianapolis ABCs players
Lincoln Giants players
New York Black Yankees players
20th-century African-American sportspeople
Baseball infielders
Burials at Cypress Hills National Cemetery